Robert Greifeld (born 1957) is an American businessman and was the chairman of Nasdaq, the largest electronic screen-based equity securities market in the United States. He served as CEO from 2003 to 2016 and was succeeded by Adena Friedman. Greifeld focused the NASDAQ-OMX mission on being the premier U.S equities market, leveraging NASDAQ-OMX's fundamental market structure advantage. He stepped down as Chairman in May 2017 to become Chairman of Virtu Financial.

Early life
Greifeld was born in Queens, New York, to an Italian American mother and a father of Irish and German descent.

Career
He has a 20-year history in technology, and as an entrepreneur created one of the first electronic stock order matching systems. He has led NASDAQ-OMX to nine straight quarters of top line growth.  The year 2006 was NASDAQ-OMX's most successful since it began reporting financials in 1997; and in 2005, NASDAQ-OMX's stock was the number one performer across all markets.  
 
Greifeld is an outspoken advocate for efficient capital markets, good regulation and ensuring that the U.S. markets continue to support business growth and innovation. He is a former member of the Committee on Capital Markets Regulation.

Prior to joining NASDAQ in May 2003, Greifeld was an Executive Vice-President with SunGard Data Systems, Inc., a $6.2 billion market cap company. Greifeld holds a master's degree in business from the New York University Stern School of Business, and a B.A. in English from Iona College.

Greifeld gave the commencement address at Iona College for the undergraduates of 2016 on May 21.

Early in Greifeld's career in the 1980s, he was a District Manager for Unisys in Jericho, NY. From there he joined Automated Securities Clearance, Inc. and then Sunguard.

Greifeld has resided with his wife and family in Westfield, New Jersey and Readington Township, New Jersey.

References

1957 births
Living people
American chief executives of financial services companies
American people of German descent
American people of Irish descent
American people of Italian descent
Businesspeople from New Jersey
Businesspeople from Queens, New York
Iona University alumni
New York University Stern School of Business alumni
People from Queens, New York
People from Readington Township, New Jersey
People from Westfield, New Jersey